Reza Abdoh (also Romanized as “Rezā Abdoh”) (February 23, 1963 – May 11, 1995) was an Iranian-born director and playwright known for large-scale, experimental theatrical productions, often staged in unusual spaces like warehouses and abandoned buildings.

Early life and family 
Abdoh was born in Tehran in 1963, the first child of Ali Abdoh, a prominent athlete, businessman and founder of the Persepolis Football Club, and Homa Oboodi (née Mohajerin). His paternal grandfather was Mohammad Abdoh Boroujerdi, a chief justice and expert in Islamic law in the Reza Shah era. Abdoh had two brothers, Sardar "Sid" Abdoh and Salar Abdoh, and one sister, Negar. He had one half-sister, Regina, from his father's previous marriage to an American woman. On his father's side, he was first cousins once removed with Dara Khosrowshahi.

In 1977 Reza was sent to England where he attended day school in London while living with his grandmother. In 1978, he was sent to Wellington, an exclusive boarding school in Somerset, England.

In the wake of the Iranian Revolution, Ali Abdoh traveled to California with his four children and settled in West Covina, California. Reza's father, who had plans to open a hotel in Iran on the eve of the revolution, faced financial ruin. In the Fall, Reza began classes at University of Southern California where he completed one semester. In January 1980, Ali Abdoh died of a heart attack on a squash court at the Los Angeles Athletic Club. It is said that he died not long after discovering that Reza was gay.

Career
In 1983 Abdoh began directing plays, often adapting classics like King Lear, King Oedipus, and Medea in Los Angeles theaters.

In 1990, Abdoh directed Father Was a Peculiar Man, a multimedia performance produced by En Garde Arts featuring more than 50 performers that occurred across four blocks of New York City's Meatpacking District. That year he also wrote and directed The Hip-Hop Waltz of Eurydice, staged at the Los Angeles Theatre Center. Abdoh called it a "gut reaction to systemic repression and erosion of freedom" in an interview with Thomas Leabhart published in Mime Journal. His work often confronted such issues as race, class and, the AIDS crisis.

Abdoh worked on several productions with the New York City and Los Angeles theater ensemble Dar a Luz, which he formed in 1991. Productions with the company included The Law of Remains (1992), Tight Right White (1993) and Quotations From a Ruined City (1994), co-written with his brother, Salar Abdoh. His later work was called "nightmarish" and used multimedia elements with downtown theater conventions to "bombard" audiences. New York Times critic Stephen Holden called Abdoh "a theatrical visionary" in his obituary.

Abdoh was known for his use of video in his sets, and he also created several videos between 1986 and 1991. In 1992 Abdoh wrote and directed the feature-length film The Blind Owl.

Death 
Abdoh died due to causes related to AIDS on May 11, 1995.

Legacy 
He is the subject of the book Reza Abdoh, edited by Daniel Mufson; his papers and videotapes of some performances are kept at the New York Public Library for the Performing Arts.

Reza Abdoh: Theatre Visionary, a documentary film about Abdoh and his work, was completed by director Adam Soch in 2016.

In 2018, MoMA PS1 hosted a retrospective exhibition titled Reza Abdoh curated by Negar Azimi, Tiffany Malakooti, and Babak Radboy of Bidoun with Klaus Biesenbach.

Critic Jennifer Krasinski wrote in Artforum "It is not an overstatement to say that had Reza Abdoh lived even one more year, had he created even one more production, American theater would look very different now."

Performances 

 Three Plays (Pristine Love, Heads, and Saliva Milkshake), written by Howard Brenton, 1983
 King Lear, written by William Shakespeare, 1984
 The Farmyard, written by Franz Xaver Kroetz, 1985
 The Sound of a Voice and As the Crow Flies, written by David Henry Hwang, directed by Abdoh, 1985
 A Medea: Requiem for a Boy with a White White Toy, adapted from Euripides, 1986
 Rusty Sat on a Hill One Dawn and Watched the Moon Go Down, 1986
 King Oedipus, adapted from Sophocles, 1987
 Eva Peron, written by Copi, 1987
 Peep Show, written by Mira-Lani Oglesby and Reza Abdoh, 1988
 Minamata, written by Mira-Lani Oglesby and Reza Abdoh, 1989
 Father Was a Peculiar Man, written by Mira-Lani Oglesby and Reza Abdoh, 1990
 The Hip-Hop Waltz of Eurydice, 1990
 Pasos en la Obscuridad, written by Frank Ambriz and Reza Abdoh, 1990
 Bogeyman, 1991
 The Law of Remains, 1992
 Simon Boccanegra, written by Giuseppe Verdi, 1992
 Tight Right White, 1993
 Quotations from a Ruined City, written by Salar Abdoh and Reza Abdoh, 1994
 A Story of Infamy, written by Salar Abdoh and Reza Abdoh, did not reach production due to Abdoh's death

Film and video 

 My Face, short, 1988
 Sleeping with the Devil, short, 1990
 The Weeping Song, short, 1991
 Daddy's Girl, short, 1991
 The Blind Owl, feature film, 1992
 The Tryst, unfinished feature film, 1993
 Train Project, unfinished film

References

External links 
 Reza Abdoh collection of papers, 1983-1999, held by the Billy Rose Theatre Division, New York Public Library for the Performing Arts
 Reza Abdoh production videos, on UbuWeb, in partnership with Bidoun Magazine
 Interview with Salar Abdoh in Bidoun Magazine
 Reza Abdoh: Theatre Visionary documentary film

1963 births
1995 deaths
AIDS-related deaths in New York (state)
American theatre directors
American gay writers
Iranian emigrants to the United States
Iranian theatre directors
Iranian dramatists and playwrights
Iranian LGBT writers
American LGBT people of Asian descent
Writers from Tehran
Gay dramatists and playwrights
20th-century American dramatists and playwrights
American male dramatists and playwrights
American LGBT dramatists and playwrights
20th-century American male writers
Iranian LGBT artists
American video artists
20th-century American LGBT people